Anguilla competed in the 2014 Commonwealth Games in Glasgow, Scotland from July 23 to August 3, 2014. On June 30, 2014, Anguilla's final squad of 12 athletes in 2 sports was named.

Athletics

A team of 7 athletes were named to the final squad.

Men

Women
Field events

Combined events – Heptathlon

Key
Note–Ranks given for track events are within the athlete's heat only
Q = Qualified for the next round
q = Qualified for the next round as a fastest loser or, in field events, by position without achieving the qualifying target
NR = National record
N/A = Round not applicable for the event
Bye = Athlete not required to compete in round

Cycling

A team of 5 athletes were named to the final squad.

Road

Men

References

Nations at the 2014 Commonwealth Games
Anguilla at the Commonwealth Games
2014 in Anguilla